Anutai Wagh (17 March 1910 – 1992) was one of the pioneers of pre-school education in India. She was the professional colleague of Tarabai Modak. She along with Modak pioneered a programme whose curriculum was indigenous, used low cost teaching aids and was aimed at holistic development of the participants. A. D. N. Bajpai describes her as a "towering social reformer". She was a recipient of the 1985 Jamnalal Bajaj Award. a Anutai Wagh Information Autobiography-From the hill of Kosbad

References

1910 births
1992 deaths
Indian women educational theorists
20th-century Indian educational theorists
Indian social reformers
Recipients of the Padma Shri in social work
Social workers
20th-century women educators
20th-century Indian women